Service W8 is a bus service which operates between Wellingborough and Bozeat via Wollaston.

History 
The bus route was operated by Stagecoach in the past prior to being taken over by Centrebus. Following a decision by Northamptonshire County Council to cancel all bus route subsidies, then-operator Centrebus stated that the W8 route would be cut as a result. In November 2019, the service transferred from Centrebus to Grant Palmer. The company had informed the council that the route was no longer viable due to financial pressure and a driver shortage. The council subsequently decided to spend £14,000 on subsidising the route until April 2022. On 8 November 2021, the service will transfer from Grant Palmer to Stagecoach East Midlands.

Usage 
In 2018 it was estimated that around 30 people used the route. It currently runs at an hourly frequency.

References 

Bus routes in England